John Eric Macrae  was Dean of Brechin from 1936 until 1947.

He was educated at the University of St Andrews and ordained in 1894. He served curacies at St Andrew, Dundee and St Saviour, Pimlico. After this he was the Chaplain of Edinburgh Theological College. During World War I he was a Chaplain to the Forces.

Notes

Alumni of the University of St Andrews
Scottish Episcopalian clergy
Deans of Brechin
Year of birth missing
Year of death missing
People associated with Dundee